Michela Luci (born May 19, 2006) is a Canadian actress from Ancaster, Ontario, most noted as the leading role of Dino Dana. She won a Daytime Emmy Award for Outstanding Performer in a Children's, Family Viewing or Special Class Program at the 45th Daytime Emmy Awards, and is a two-time Canadian Screen Award nominee for Best Performance in a Children's or Youth Program or Series at the 6th Canadian Screen Awards in 2018 and the 7th Canadian Screen Awards in 2019. She also portrayed Tabby in the science fiction series Endlings, which premiered on January 5, 2020 on CBC Television in Canada and Hulu in the U.S.

Early life
Michela Luci was born in Hamilton, Ontario to mother Lucy Fricano. She attended Immaculate Conception School.

Career 
Luci first gained recognition as a judge on YTV’s Cook’d and went on to book the recurring role of Agent Orchid on the Emmy award-winning TVOKids and PBS Kids series Odd Squad. The series' creator Tim McKeon said he was "so impressed with [Luci's] talent and professionalism" saying he "always found her to be hard working, courteous and well-prepared". Luci was nominated for Young Artist Awards twice for her work in Odd Squad, in 2015 and 2017. She and the cast of Odd Squad won a Joey Award in 2015. In 2016, Luci appeared in Odd Squad: The Movie as Agent Orchid. This marked her first theatrical appearance. In the same year, she also formed the all-girl group GEN:ZED (formerly GFORCE) with a group of friends from the Greater Toronto Area.

Luci and the other members of GFORCE auditioned for season 14 of America's Got Talent, singing their original song "Break the Banks". The group received four yeses from all four judges. Luci also voiced the titular protagonist in the Netflix original True and the Rainbow Kingdom. She then took on a voice acting role of Princess Flug in TVOKids and Nick Jr.'s Abby Hatcher. In 2018, she was nominated for two Young Entertainer Awards, a Daytime Emmy Award and a Canadian Screen Award for her work in True and the Rainbow Kingdom and Dino Dana. In 2019, season three of Dino Dana began airing. Luci was nominated for three awards for her work in Dino Dana including winning a Daytime Emmy Award and a Youth Media Alliance Award of Excellence. Luci was cast as Tabby on Hulu original Endlings. She stars in Dino Dana: The Movie, released in September 2020 on Amazon Prime Video after originally slated to be released in early 2020 but was delayed due to the COVID-19 pandemic.

Filmography

Films

Television

Awards and nominations

References

External links
 
 Michela Luci on Instagram

2006 births
Living people
Actresses from Hamilton, Ontario
America's Got Talent contestants
Canadian child actresses
Canadian film actresses
Canadian people of Italian descent
Canadian television actresses
Canadian voice actresses
Daytime Emmy Award winners
21st-century Canadian actresses